Iskra is a 2017 Montenegrin drama film directed by Gojko Berkuljan. It was selected as the Montenegrin entry for the Best Foreign Language Film at the 91st Academy Awards, but it was not nominated.

Cast
 Jelena Simic as Iskra

See also
 List of submissions to the 91st Academy Awards for Best Foreign Language Film
 List of Montenegrin submissions for the Academy Award for Best Foreign Language Film

References

External links
 

2017 films
2017 drama films
Montenegrin drama films
2010s Serbian-language films